KUGR is an AM radio station located in Green River, Wyoming operating on 1490 kHz AM. It carries a soft adult contemporary and talk format. The station is owned by Wagonwheel Communications Corporation. KUGR won the Wyoming Association of Broadcasters board "Station of the Year" award in 2006. The station celebrated its 30th year of broadcasting in June 2006. KUGR signed on in 1976.

This station part of "The Radio Network", which includes FM sister stations KFRZ 92.1 FM, KYCS 95.1 FM and KZWB 97.9 FM which came on air in 2005.

Current format
KUGR has a variety of programming daily. News can be heard throughout the day. KUGR's music was previously satellite fed until 2004 when the decision was made to play music from several CD players. The source of music has changed several times since, from music on a hard drive and then back to satellite. KUGR's music is mostly soft AC, but includes top 40 songs as well. KUGR and its sister stations often do remote broadcasts at local businesses during sales.

Programs
"The Al and Faith Morning Show," mornings hosted by Al and his wife Faith. (Weekdays)
"Let's Talk," a periodical show hosted by Al Harris. (Weekdays)
When Radio Was and Imagination Theater (Sundays)
Coast to Coast AM (Nights)
The Jim Bohannon Show (Weeknights)
Colorado Rockies Baseball (Saturday games during the season)
Wyoming Cowboys football (during the season)
 Local high school sports (boys football and basketball during their seasons)
 News and various other programs from the Cowboy State News Network(weekdays)

Coverage and signal strength
KUGR broadcasts a one thousand watt signal day and night. The signal covers much of Sweetwater County and has been heard even farther distances. The frequency KUGR operates on (1490 kHz) is classified as a local type station by the Federal Communications Commission (FCC), which means outside of Sweetwater County during the evening, KUGR will be competing with many other stations on the same frequency. KUGR is well known throughout the county and is a popular station thanks to its programming and variety.

Translator
KUGR operates a low power translator station, broadcasting from Wilkins Peak. This station is known as K285FG and has since September 27, 2013 been operating on 104.9 FM. K285FG broadcasts 250 watts. The translator station is currently simulcasting all of the AM programming on FM.

While not as powerful as its larger sister stations, such as KYCS and KFRZ, the signal of the translator is audible throughout most of Sweetwater County, and into parts of Uinta County to the east. The translator's coverage area mimics its parent station, as both achieve relatively the same distance, except during the evening hours when skywave radio propagation is present for KUGR.

References

External links

KUGR studio tour

UGR
Radio stations established in 1976
News and talk radio stations in the United States
Soft adult contemporary radio stations in the United States
Sweetwater County, Wyoming
1976 establishments in Wyoming